Babacar Diallo (born 25 March 1989) is a Senegalese football player.

Honours

Individual
Veikkausliiga Team of the Year: 2019

References

External links
 
 Profile at veikkausliiga.com 

1989 births
Living people
Senegalese footballers
Dardanelspor footballers
FC Inter Turku players
Rochester New York FC players
Kuopion Palloseura players
SKN St. Pölten players
Veikkausliiga players
Austrian Football Bundesliga players
USL Championship players
Expatriate footballers in Turkey
Senegalese expatriate sportspeople in Turkey
Expatriate footballers in Finland
Senegalese expatriate sportspeople in Finland
Expatriate soccer players in the United States
Senegalese expatriate sportspeople in the United States
Expatriate footballers in Austria
Senegalese expatriate sportspeople in Austria
Association football defenders